= Al Wathba National Insurance Co =

Al Wathba National Insurance Company
- Company type: Public Company(Abu Dhabi EX)
- Industry: Insurance
- Founded: 1996
- Headquarters: Abu Dhabi, the United Arab Emirates
- Key people: Sheikh Saif Bin Mohamed Bin Butti Al- Hamed (Chairman of the board), Bassam Chilmeran (CEO)
- Products: Vehicle insurance, Life insurance, Medical insurance, Personal line insurance
- Website: www.awnic.com

Al Wathba National Insurance Co P.S.J.C (AWNIC) (Arabic: شَرِكَة الْوَثْبَة الْوَطَنِيَّة لِلتَّأْمِيْن, romanized: Sharikat Al-Wathbah Al-Waṭaniyyah Lit-Taʾmīn) is a national insurance company of the United Arab Emirates. It was established in 1996, with its registered head office in Abu Dhabi. Sheikh Saif Bin Mohamed Bin Butti Al Hamed is the chairman, and Bassam Chilmeran is the CEO.

== Products ==
Al Wathba National Insurance Company offers insurance services for individuals, family, and corporate clients in life, medical, and personal line insurance (Motor, Property, Engineering, Energy, Marine, Marine Cargo etc.).
